Payame Noor University (PNU; Persian: Dāneŝgāhe Payāme Nur) is a large public university in Iran, with its headquarters in Tehran. Established in 1988, is a legal body under the Ministry of Science, Research and Technology. Payame Noor means "the message of light" in Persian.

PNU was established in 1988 in the Iran, after having integrated the University of Abu Rayhan al-Biruni and Iran Free University. PNU took its first intake in five-degree programs at 28 study centres. Payame Noor University is considered to be one of the most prestigious universities of Iran taking its rightful place among the top educational institutions of the country. Despite being one of the youngest universities in Iran, Payame Noor University ranks high in international ratings.

The university has held the record of publishing articles per student in Iran since 2013.

History 

PNU is a modern innovative university, established by decisions based on the meetings (No. 94 & 97) in 1986 by SCCR (Supreme Council of the Cultural Revolution of Iran). PNU was established in 1988 in the Iran, after having integrated the University of Abu Rayhan al-Biruni and Iran Free University.

One of Payame Noor University's Tehran campuses (which was previously Damavand College, or Damavand Higher Educational Institute) was completed in 1976 and is one of the three buildings in Iran designed and built by Taliesin Associated Architects (Frank Lloyd Wright Foundation) and William Wesley Peters.

About 
Payame Noor University is one of the large and prestigious public universities in Iran. It is a global mega university, whose name means "the message of light" in Persian. The school has 502 campus locations in 2020.

The PNU school offers undergraduate degrees, postgraduate degrees and PhDs. Graduates of this university receive an official decree from the Ministry of Science, Research and Technology. The diplomas awarded to the students of this university are valid for continuing their studies in higher levels inside and outside the country and employment in all government institutions and organizations.

Payame Noor University signed a memorandum of cooperation in the national plan to strengthen and identify children and adolescents in the field of coding. PNU is also holding the second general assembly of the network of virtual universities in the Islamic world.

The education system, like the Iranian higher education system, has two semesters and one summer semester. However, the educational calendar in PNU Afghanistan is different, according to the regulations of that center.

Admissions 
In Iran, admission to college is competitive and only top students may achieve this honour. Undergraduate and graduate prospective students are admitted at the Iranian public university on the basis of their GPA and the National University Entrance Exam result. International students can apply directly to the admission office of each university but should take the Standard Persian Language Proficiency Test (SAMFA test), to show their Persian language proficiency.

Affiliations
In 2017, by order of the President of the National Federation of University Sports, the director-general of PNU Physical Education became the head of the country's student powerlifting association.

Expanding the exchange of scientific information with universities and reputable international research associations is one of the goals of Payame Noor University. The National Islamic Comprehensive of India, Islamic and International Multimedia of Malaysia, Tishrin, Aftarah and Damascus Syria. The university is also an active member of several prestigious international scientific associations in the world, such as the Asian Association of Open Universities (AAOU), the International Council for Open and Distance Education (ICDE), Organisation of Islamic Cooperation (OIC), UNITWIN/UNESCO, Iran National Science Foundation (INSF), and the Federation of the Universities of the Islamic World (FUIW), Islamic World Educational, Scientific and Cultural Organization (ICESCO).

PNU is the UNESCO Chair Environmental Education. Payame Noor University as the first university in Iran, has proceeded in designing and implementation of an environment training and education course in master's degree from 2008 with 500 graduating students and also has designed and implemented an Environmental Education Ph.D. course in 2012 with 40 Ph.D. candidates up to now. In order to accomplish the educational and research goals of this discipline, permission for Environmental Education and Sustainable development scientific-research quarterly journal was obtained from Ministry of Science, Researches, and Technology, which was published since 2012. Environmental Education Group in Payame Noor University, has held some festivals and exhibitions in 2009, 2010, and 2011, and the First National Conference for Environmental Education has held in 2011. Environmental Education association started its activity from 2015 by 540 memberships as all MA and Ph.D. students. Regarding establishment of a UNESCO chair about Environmental Education in Payame Noor University in 2017, it is expected that this program can achieve its desired goals by available potentials and cooperation between academia, civil society, local communities, researchers, and policy-makers, governmental and nongovernmental organizations (NGO).

Payam Noor University is a member of UNITWIN. UNITWIN is the abbreviation for the university twinning and networking scheme. This UNESCO Programme was established in 1992. The UNITWIN/UNESCO Chairs Program consists of the establishment of UNESCO Chairs and UNITWIN Networks in higher education institutions. The UNITWIN/UNESCO Chairs Program promotes international inter-university cooperation and networking to enhance institutional capacities through knowledge sharing and collaborative work. The Program supports the establishment of UNESCO Chairs and UNITWIN Networks in key priority areas related to UNESCO's fields of competence – i.e. in education, the natural and social sciences, culture and communication.
Through this network, higher education and research institutions all over the globe pool their resources, both human and material, to address pressing challenges and contribute to the development of their societies. In many instances, the Networks and Chairs serve as think tanks and as bridge builders between academia, civil society, local communities, researchers and policy-makers. They have proven useful in informing policy decisions, establishing new teaching initiatives, generating innovation through research and contributing to the enrichment of existing university programs while promoting cultural diversity.
As of May 2017, about 700 Chairs are established within the program around the globe in 116 countries covering about 70 disciplines. There are presently 24 UNESCO Chairs in the field of environmental education and education for sustainable development. In March 2017 Payame noor University as 14th UNESCO chair in Iran was selected by UNESCO to establish a chair in the field of Environmental Education specially in the regard of waste management for 4 years. Dr. Seyed Mohammad Shobeiri selected as Chair holder and leads the program.

Student life
Payame Noor University has numerous sports, religious, and cultural centers and extracurricular activities, and tries to direct the potential energy of the youth in the right directions. Payame Noor University has also an analytical news agency which known an UPNA.
Payame Noor University has more than 21 student scientific associations.

Publishing
Payame Noor University [Conference] System is in fact an online system that helps Payame Noor University Centers to hold their scientific conferences at the international, national and regional levels without having to worry about conflicts with traditional methods of receiving articles and judging them. This system manages all the stages of holding a conference from launching the website and informing to registering and receiving papers.

Publishing of about 2700 books at the editorial office from 1988 to 2018.

Rankings
PNU is ranked by the Center for World University Rankings (CWUR) in 2019-2020 as rank 27 in Iran, and globally rank 1626. PNU is not ranked as one of the "Best Global Universities in Iran" in the U.S. News & World Report. The QS World University Rankings does not rank PNU. Academic Ranking of World Universities does not rank PNU.

Notable alumni

Notable academics

Controversies 
Iranian universities faced criticism in early 2007 about their treatment of students who follow the Baháʼí Faith. Although religious identification has been removed from entrance exam papers, the state sanctioned persecution of Baháʼís has led to students reportedly being expelled once their religion is discovered. The controversy specifically focused on Payame Noor University when an official university letter confirmed the expulsion as government policy. Over 30 Baháʼí students have been expelled under the policy.

Additionally, in 2008, the university declared that Arabic will be the "second language" of the university and that all its services will be offered in Arabic, concurrent with Persian.

PNU has been accused of being part of Iran's "publication bazaar," with local politicians and diplomats receiving advanced degrees without efforts or attendance.

Locations 
As of 2020, PNU has 502 campuses, which include locations in Iran and globally.

Nationwide locations
 Tehran headquarters: Nakhl St, Lashkarak Highway, Tehran 19569 
Karaj: Ghalamestan Street, Karaj, Iran (in the Gohardasht neighborhood) 
Shiraz: Lashkarak Road, PO Box 19395–4697, Shiraz, Fars Province, Iran
Zanjan: Imamat Street, Russell Square, Zanjan, Zanjan Province, Iran

Global locations

 Azerbaijan: Baku, Khatai zone, Nobel 14, Walie Asr Educational complex, Embassy of I.R. of Iran, PNU University Building
 Erbil, Kurdistan: Fazel miranist, Shoresh
 Milan, Italy: Milano mantova strada cisa, N. 99
 Tajikistan: Dushanbe, Nemat Gharbayov 5,21 House
 Turkey: Şenlikköy Mahallesi, Hürriyet Caddesi, Karabay Apt. A Blok, No. 3/2, Florya, Bakirköy, Istanbul, Turkey
 Oman: Muscat, Al-Arabia zone, 3060 AV. , No 302
 Qatar: Dafnah, cultural consultation of I.R. of Iran
 Kuwait: Salemia, Abuzar ghafari Av. , Unit 12, No 6
 Georgia: 1 a Evgeni Mikeladze str., 0159, Tbilisi, Georgia
 Malaysia: c8-3 dataran palma ampangpoint jalanan ampong selangor
 France: Paris - Numéro 11 Rue PACHE
 Canada: 1120 7905 Bayview Ave, Thornhill, Ontario L3T 7n3

See also 

Higher education in Iran
List of universities in Iran

References

External links 

Official website, in Persian and English

Education in Iran
Educational institutions established in 1987
Payame Noor University
1987 establishments in Iran